Christopher John Lamb  (19 March 1950 – 21 August 2009) was a Professor of Plant Biology at the University of East Anglia and director of the John Innes Centre.

His field of study was plant–pathogen interactions, and he made many contributions to the understanding of plant pathology.

Education
Lamb graduated from Fitzwilliam College, Cambridge with a Bachelor of Arts degree in Natural Sciences in 1972 which was followed by a PhD in Plant Biochemistry in 1976 also in Cambridge.

Career and research
From 1975 to 1982 he worked at the University of Oxford, first as an ICI Research Fellow in the School of Botany, then as a Browne Research Fellow at The Queen's College. In 1982 he moved to the Salk Institute for Biological Studies in La Jolla, California where he was director of the plant biology laboratory until 1998. In 1999 he returned to the United Kingdom, first at the University of Edinburgh where he was Regius Professor of Plant Science then at the University of East Anglia where he was a Professor and director of the John Innes Centre.

References

Fellows of the Royal Society
Alumni of Fitzwilliam College, Cambridge
Fellows of The Queen's College, Oxford
Academics of the University of Edinburgh
Academics of the University of East Anglia
English biologists
Commanders of the Order of the British Empire
1950 births
2009 deaths
Place of birth missing
20th-century biologists